Lance Whitaker (born May 29, 1971) is an American former professional boxer. As an amateur in the super heavyweight division, he won a bronze medal at the 1995 Pan American Games. Nicknamed "Mount", or more recently "Goofi", Whitaker was known for his size – 6 feet, 8 inches – and personability.

Early life
A native of Granada Hills, Los Angeles, Whitaker attended San Fernando High School, where he played football and basketball. In 1989, he was convinced to start boxing by local trainer Francisco Ortega, who spotted him while he was waiting in line at a Burger King restaurant.

Amateur career
Whitaker won the National Golden Gloves Super Heavyweight title in 1993, followed by the United States (AAU) National Amateur Super Heavyweight title in 1994.

 National Golden Gloves, Little Rock, Arkansas, May 1993:
 1/4: Defeated Marcus Johnson
 1/2: Defeated Levone Seegars KO 1
 Finals: Defeated Ed Mahone PTS
U.S. Olympic Festival, San Antonio, Texas, July-August 1993:
 Finals: Lost to Reginald Blackmon 9–18
 United States National Championships, 1994:
 Finals: Defeated Robert Geer PTS
 Goodwill Games, Saint Petersburg, Russia, July 1994:
 1/2: Defeated Erik Fuhrmann (Germany) 21–3
 Finals: Lost to Alexei Lezin (Russia) 0–17
U.S. Pan Am Trials, Portland, Oregon, January 1995:
 1/2: Defeated Ed Mahone 32–21
 Finals: Defeated Alvin Manley 25–13

 Giraldo Córdova Cardín, Matanzas, Cuba, February 1995:
 1/4: Defeated Roberto Camilo (Cuba) 13–9
 1/2: Lost to Pedro Carrión (Cuba) by walkover
 Pan American Games, Mar del Plata, Argentina, March 1995:
 1/4: Defeated Andrew Stewart (Grenada) by walkover
 1/2: Lost to Leonardo Martinez Fizz (Cuba) KO 1
United States National Championships, Colorado Springs, Colorado, February 1996:
 Finals: Lost to Lawrence Clay-Bey RSC 3
U.S. Olympic Box-Offs, 1996:
 Day 1: Lost to T. J. Wilson PTS
 Day 2: Lost to Charles Shufford

Professional career
Whitaker turned pro in 1996 and quickly climbed the rankings with knockout wins over limited competition.  A win over faded contender Alex Stewart landed him a fight against Lou Savarese in 1999.  Savarese ended Whitaker's 18 fight unbeaten streak with a decision win.   Whitaker then went on later that year to hand Monte Barrett his first loss and in 2000 knocked out undefeated Robert Davis.
Whitaker then scored a devastating KO victory over contender Oleg Maskaev 2001, perhaps the biggest win of his career.  At this point Whitaker was seen by many as having the potential to be a future heavyweight champion.  Unfortunately for Whitaker, he lost his next fight to Jameel McCline by unanimous decision.  He then drifted into journeyman obscurity, and was knocked out by Luan Krasniqi in 2005.  In 2006 Whitaker lost to Sultan Ibragimov by knockout, effectively putting an end to his hope for future title belt opportunities.  Whitaker continues to fight, but hasn't been highly ranked as a heavyweight in several years.

Nickname
Whitaker is likely most known for his bizarre adoption of the "Goofi" nickname prior to his fight with McCline in 2001.  Whitaker's popularity was skyrocketing in boxing circles, and his promoter, the infamous Rock Newman, concocted the stunt to generate publicity and sentiment towards Whitaker.

Professional boxing record

|-
|align="center" colspan=8|35 Wins (28 knockouts, 7 decisions), 7 Losses (3 knockouts, 4 decisions), 1 No Contest
|-
| align="center" style="border-style: none none solid solid; background: #e3e3e3"|Result
| align="center" style="border-style: none none solid solid; background: #e3e3e3"|OppRecord
| align="center" style="border-style: none none solid solid; background: #e3e3e3"|Opponent
| align="center" style="border-style: none none solid solid; background: #e3e3e3"|Type
| align="center" style="border-style: none none solid solid; background: #e3e3e3"|Round
| align="center" style="border-style: none none solid solid; background: #e3e3e3"|Date
| align="center" style="border-style: none none solid solid; background: #e3e3e3"|Location
| align="center" style="border-style: none none solid solid; background: #e3e3e3"|Notes
|-align=center
|Loss
|
|align=left| Franklin Lawrence
|KO
|7
|11/09/2010
|align=left| Riverside, California, U.S.
|align=left|
|-
|Win
|
|align=left| Andrey Fedosov
|SD
|12
|12/06/2010
|align=left| Hollywood, California, U.S.
|align=left|
|-
|Loss
|
|align=left| Oliver McCall
|UD
|10
|23/10/2009
|align=left| Las Vegas, Nevada, U.S.
|align=left|
|-
|Win
|
|align=left| Mathew Ellis
|TKO
|1
|21/08/2009
|align=left| Redondo Beach, California, U.S.
|align=left|
|-
|Win
|
|align=left| Danny Batchelder
|UD
|10
|17/07/2009
|align=left| Redondo Beach, California, U.S.
|align=left|
|-
|Loss
|
|align=left| Jason Estrada
|UD
|10
|04/04/2008
|align=left| Lincoln, Rhode Island, U.S.
|align=left|
|-
|Win
|
|align=left| Ron Johnson
|TKO
|1
|23/02/2008
|align=left| Russellville, Arkansas, U.S.
|align=left|
|-
|Loss
|
|align=left| Sultan Ibragimov
|TKO
|7
|15/12/2005
|align=left| Hollywood, Florida, U.S.
|align=left|
|-
|Win
|
|align=left| Gabe Brown
|TKO
|5
|01/10/2005
|align=left| Tampa, Florida, U.S.
|align=left|
|-
|Win
|
|align=left| Louis Monaco
|TKO
|3
|26/08/2005
|align=left| Hollywood, Florida, U.S.
|align=left|
|-
|Loss
|
|align=left| Luan Krasniqi
|KO
|6
|28/05/2005
|align=left| Stuttgart, Germany
|align=left|
|-
|Win
|
|align=left| Otis Tisdale
|TKO
|1
|05/08/2004
|align=left| Hollywood, Florida, U.S.
|align=left|
|-
|Win
|
|align=left| Friday Ahunanya
|TKO
|5
|17/04/2004
|align=left| Tampa, Florida, U.S.
|align=left|
|-
|Win
|
|align=left| Al Cole
|UD
|12
|30/10/2003
|align=left| Coconut Creek, Florida, U.S.
|align=left|
|-
|Win
|
|align=left| Russell Chasteen
|TKO
|2
|28/06/2003
|align=left| Coconut Creek, Florida, U.S.
|align=left|
|-
|Win
|
|align=left| Cliff Couser
|KO
|5
|13/10/2002
|align=left| Choctaw, Mississippi, U.S.
|align=left|
|-
|Draw
|
|align=left| Ray Austin
|SD
|10
|13/04/2002
|align=left| Chester, West Virginia, U.S.
|align=left|
|-
|Win
|
|align=left| Willie Chapman
|TKO
|4
|01/02/2002
|align=left| Phoenix, Arizona, U.S.
|align=left|
|-
|Loss
|
|align=left| Jameel McCline
|UD
|12
|01/12/2001
|align=left| New York City, U.S.
|align=left|
|-
|Win
|
|align=left| Oleg Maskaev
|KO
|2
|10/03/2001
|align=left| Las Vegas, Nevada, U.S.
|align=left|
|-
|Win
|
|align=left| Robert Davis
|TKO
|2
|07/10/2000
|align=left| Uncasville, Connecticut, U.S.
|align=left|
|-
|Win
|
|align=left| David Dixon
|DQ
|1
|21/07/2000
|align=left| Las Vegas, Nevada, U.S.
|align=left|
|-
|Win
|
|align=left| Thomas Williams
|TKO
|2
|11/06/2000
|align=left| Concho, Oklahoma, U.S.
|align=left|
|-
|Win
|
|align=left| Monte Barrett
|SD
|12
|28/08/1999
|align=left| Las Vegas, Nevada, U.S.
|align=left|
|-
|Loss
|
|align=left| Lou Savarese
|SD
|10
|06/03/1999
|align=left| Atlantic City, New Jersey, U.S.
|align=left|
|-
|Win
|
|align=left| Alex Stewart
|TKO
|7
|16/01/1999
|align=left| Las Vegas, Nevada, U.S.
|align=left|
|-
|Win
|
|align=left| Jason Yarosz
|TKO
|2
|08/10/1998
|align=left| Kansas City, Missouri, U.S.
|align=left|
|-
|Win
|
|align=left| Ray Butler
|TKO
|6
|01/05/1998
|align=left| San Antonio, Texas, U.S.
|align=left|
|-
|Win
|
|align=left| Garing Lane
|UD
|8
|27/03/1998
|align=left| Atlantic City, New Jersey, U.S.
|align=left|
|-
|Win
|
|align=left| Everett Martin
|UD
|8
|27/02/1998
|align=left| Studio City, California, U.S.
|align=left|
|-
|Win
|
|align=left| Joe Ballard
|TKO
|1
|16/01/1998
|align=left| Atlantic City, New Jersey, U.S.
|align=left|
|-
|Win
|
|align=left| Eddie Gonzales
|TKO
|1
|13/12/1997
|align=left| Northlake, Illinois, U.S.
|align=left|
|-
|Win
|
|align=left| Marcus Rhode
|TKO
|2
|14/11/1997
|align=left| South Padre Island, Texas, U.S.
|align=left|
|-
|Win
|
|align=left| Larry Menefee
|TKO
|2
|17/10/1997
|align=left| Phoenix, Arizona, U.S.
|align=left|
|-
|Win
|
|align=left| Isaac Brown
|TKO
|1
|09/08/1997
|align=left| South Padre Island, Texas, U.S.
|align=left|
|-
|Win
|
|align=left| Muhammed Raheem
|KO
|1
|19/07/1997
|align=left| Indio, California, U.S.
|align=left|
|-
|Win
|
|align=left| Jerriel Bazile
|TKO
|3
|05/07/1997
|align=left| Moline, Illinois, U.S.
|align=left|
|-
|Win
|
|align=left| Orlando Leavall
|KO
|2
|25/02/1997
|align=left| Long Beach, California, U.S.
|align=left|
|-
|Win
|
|align=left| Marco Dickson
|KO
|2
|17/01/1997
|align=left| Los Angeles, California, U.S.
|align=left|
|-
|Win
|
|align=left| Ricardo Phillips
|KO
|2
|03/12/1996
|align=left| Indio, California, U.S.
|align=left|
|-
|Win
|
|align=left| Ricardo Phillips
|KO
|2
|03/12/1996
|align=left| Indio, California, U.S.
|align=left|
|-
|Win
|
|align=left| Dion Burgess
|KO
|1
|21/11/1996
|align=left| Los Angeles, California, U.S.
|align=left|
|-
|Win
|
|align=left| Mario Osuna
|TKO
|1
|16/09/1996
|align=left| Las Vegas, Nevada, U.S.
|align=left|
|-
|Win
|
|align=left| John Keyes
|KO
|1
|10/07/1996
|align=left| Beverly Hills, California, U.S.
|align=left|
|}

References

External links
 
 BoxingRecords

1971 births
Living people
People from Granada Hills, Los Angeles
Heavyweight boxers
National Golden Gloves champions
Winners of the United States Championship for amateur boxers
Boxers at the 1995 Pan American Games
Boxers from Los Angeles
American male boxers
Pan American Games bronze medalists for the United States
Pan American Games medalists in boxing
Goodwill Games medalists in boxing
Competitors at the 1994 Goodwill Games
Medalists at the 1995 Pan American Games